German submarine U-846 was a Type IXC/40 U-boat built for Nazi Germany's Kriegsmarine during World War II.

Design
German Type IXC/40 submarines were slightly larger than the original Type IXCs. U-846 had a displacement of  when at the surface and  while submerged. She had two shafts and two  propellers.

U-846 was fitted with six  torpedo tubes (four fitted at the bow and two at the stern), 22 torpedoes, one  SK C/32 naval gun, 180 rounds, and a  SK C/30 as well as a  C/30 anti-aircraft gun. The boat had a complement of forty-eight.

Service history
U-846 was ordered on 20 January 1941 from DeSchiMAG AG Weser in Bremen under the yard number 1052. Her keel was laid down on 21 July 1942. The U-boat was launched the following year on 17 February 1943. On 29 May she was commissioned into service under the command of Oberleutnant zur See der Reserve Berthold Hashagen (Crew 37) in 4th U-boat Flotilla.

After completing training, U-846 was transferred to 10th U-boat Flotilla and left Kiel for the North Atlantic on 4 December 1943. Joining groups Amrum and Rügen at the end of the month, returning without success to Lorient on 3 March 1944. U-846 left Lorient again on 29 April. During an air attack on 2 May she managed to shoot down one aircraft, Halifax 'H' of No. 58 Squadron RAF. The next day another aircraft attacked the U-boat without success, but early on 4 May a bomb hit from a Wellington, 'M' of 407 Squadron RCAF, sank U-846 in position .

References

Bibliography

External links

World War II submarines of Germany
German Type IX submarines
1942 ships
U-boats commissioned in 1943
U-boats sunk in 1944
U-boats sunk by Canadian aircraft
Ships built in Bremen (state)
Maritime incidents in May 1944